Sampeah is a Cambodian greeting or a way of showing respect. Sampeah is based on the Indian Añjali Mudrā used in namasté. Pranāma or Namaste, the part of ancient Indian culture has propagated to southeast Asia, which was part of indosphere of greater India, through the spread of Hinduism and Buddhism from India.

While performing the sampeah, the person places their palms together in a prayer-like fashion while bowing slightly.

Although the Sampeah is a form of greeting, it is also a common way to say thanks or apologize and is an important part of Khmer culture which is heavily influenced by Indian Hindu/Buddhist culture. There are different ways of bowing when performing the Sampeah. When praying to the Buddha (who founded Buddhism in India), the person places their palms together close to their face and brings their hands toward the ground three times. Just like Indian Añjali Mudrā namasté, it is also important when one Sampeahs to elders. The higher the hands and the lower the bow, the more respect is shown. It is a sign of respect and politeness.

See also
Culture of Cambodia
Culture of India
Indian honorifics
Wai
Namasté
Sembah

References

External links

Cambodian culture
Greetings
Gestures
Gestures of respect
Bowing